Genting Dream is a cruise ship of Resorts World Cruises.

The construction of Genting Dream, the first ship of the cruise brand, Dream Cruises, was completed on 12 October 2016, and the vessel sailed from Papenburg, Germany the next day. The ship was originally designed and ordered for Star Cruises, but she was transferred to Dream Cruises during construction. After the liquidation of Dream Cruises parent company, Genting Hong Kong, the vessel was chartered to Resorts World Cruises.

History 
Genting Dream was ordered as Genting World in October 2013 for Star Cruises. Construction began on 9 February 2015. In November 2015, she was transferred to sister brand Dream Cruises and on 19 August 2016 she was floated out of dry dock.

Genting Dream was christened in November 2016 in Guangzhou by Puan Sri Cecilia Lim, the wife of Genting CEO Lim Kok Thay. Following Dream Cruises insolvency, the Genting Dream was transferred to Resorts World Cruises, operating under the same name.

Areas of operation

A positioning cruise was undertaken from Papenburg to Guangzhou in 2016. Subsequently she has undertaken regional cruises from various Asian ports.

References

External links

 

2016 ships
Ships of the Dream Cruises